Costel Petrariu (born 16 July 1958) is a Romanian bobsledder. He competed at the 1984, 1988 and the 1992 Winter Olympics.

References

1958 births
Living people
Romanian male bobsledders
Olympic bobsledders of Romania
Bobsledders at the 1984 Winter Olympics
Bobsledders at the 1988 Winter Olympics
Bobsledders at the 1992 Winter Olympics